Johnno's Dead is an 8-minute film written and directed by Chris Shepherd and produced by Nicolas Schmerkin with UK producer Abigail Addison. First transmitted on the Arte France and Germany and premiered in the UK on 2 December 2016 at the London International Animation Festival. The film stars previous Shepherd collaborators Ian Hart and Chris Freeney.

Johnno's Dead is a sequel to Chris Shepherd's multi award winning 2003 short film Dad's Dead. It stars members of the original cast including Ian Hart, Chris Freeney and Dave Kent. The narrative picks up the story where the narrator goes to prison after the fire in the tower block which was caused by his best friend Johnno. The narrator is released from prison and has to adjust to life outside after serving 13 years.

Awards
 2016 - Best British Film - London International Animation Festival, London, UK
 2017 - Special Mention - Cardiff International Animation Festival, London, UK
 2017 - TV Shorts ONVI Award - Brest European Film Festival, France
 2017 - Best Animation - Aesthetica International Film Festival, UK
 2017 - Best Animated Film - Crystal Palace International Film Festival, UK

External links
 
 

2016 films
2016 short films
British short films
2010s English-language films